centrotherm international AG is a supplier of process technology and equipment for the photovoltaics, semiconductor and microelectronics industries. 
Its company headquarters are in Blaubeuren, Germany (Baden-Württemberg).

Industry sector 
centrotherm international AG develops, manufactures and markets thermal key equipment and process technology for the production of solar cells, power semiconductor devices, logic and memory devices as well as LED and sensor technologies and also provides related services to customers.

Company history 
The company was founded in 1976 as centrotherm Elektrische Anlagen GmbH + Co. KG. In the 1990s the company broke into the photovoltaic business and since 2000 has been an important global player in this industry sector. As part of company restructuring in the centrotherm Group, the name of the photovoltaic business unit was changed to centrotherm photovoltaics solutions GmbH & Co. KG in 2004 and in 2006 became centrotherm photovoltaics AG. The company has been listed on the Prime Standard of the Frankfurt Stock Exchange since October 2007 and was also listed on the German TecDAX in December of the same year.

References

External links

 01.01.2011 bis 31.03.2011 3-Month Report 01.01.2011 bis 31.03.2011 3-Months Report

Companies based in Baden-Württemberg
Photovoltaics manufacturers
Manufacturing companies of Germany
Solar power in Germany